Colleen Holder was a television news presenter and producer in the Republic of Trinidad and Tobago. 
Colleen graduated with a Bachelor of Arts Degree in Mass Communication with a major in Radio Production from the University of the West Indies, Mona, Jamaica in 1997. She worked in the newsroom of Music Radio 97 for four years before moving to Tobago in 2002 to head the newsroom of Tobago Channel 5. She then moved back to Trinidad in July 2003 to become part of the news team at CCN TV6.

She anchored the flagship news broadcast for four years before resigning from TV6 in 2007.

Colleen was noticeably absent from the media for almost two years. In April 2009, she resurfaced on the state owned television station CNMG where she anchored the station's coverage of the Fifth Summit of the Americas. She was seen as the primary news anchor of the station's flagship morning programme, First Up, also serving as the station's weekend anchor and producer. In 2010, Holder resigned from the station in protest of the unjust dismissal of one of her First Up colleagues, frontline presenter, Fazeer Mohammed.

References

Trinidad and Tobago television personalities
University of the West Indies alumni
Living people
Year of birth missing (living people)
Women television journalists
Trinidad and Tobago women